Ricky Lutton (born 26 February 1986) from Belfast is a rugby union player, who formerly played prop for Ulster.

Ulster

Lutton, who is a tight head prop but can also play loose head, returned to play for Belfast Harlequins in 2011 after a spell playing in Canterbury, New Zealand. His impressive club form resulted in him not only gaining representative honours with the Ravens, but concluded with him being awarded 'Club Player of the Year' at the Heineken Ulster Rugby Awards in May 2012.

Lutton is an excellent scrummager and is also highly capable with ball in hand. He earned a development contract with Ulster at the beginning of the 2012/13 season. His first appearance came against Edinburgh and his first start against Leinster, taking a vital role in a famous win for the province.  He was selected for the Emerging Ireland team to play in the Emerging Nations Cup in Bucharest and was rewarded with 3 appearances in the competition.

Lutton continued with Ulster in the 2013/14 season amassing 25 caps and was rewarded with a new 2 year senior contract in March 2014. Lutton was again selected to represent Emerging Ireland, this time in Bucharest and was involved in 2 matches as the Emerging Ireland team lifted the trophy.

He retired at the end of the 2016/17 season and is now playing club rugby for Ballyclare RFC.

References

Irish rugby union players
Ulster Rugby players
Living people
1986 births
Rugby union props
Rugby union players from Belfast